International Securities Exchange Holdings, Inc. (ISE) is a wholly owned subsidiary of American multinational financial services corporation Nasdaq, Inc. It is a member of the Options Clearing Corporation (OCC) and the Options Industry Council (OIC).

Founded in 2000, the ISE was conceived in 1997 when then-chairman of E-Trade, William A. Porter and his colleague, Marty Averbuch approached David Krell and Gary Katz about their concept and the four founded what is today the International Securities Exchange, a leading U.S. equity options exchange.

Launched as the first fully electronic US options exchange, ISE developed a unique market structure for advanced screen-based trading.

ISE offers equity and index options, including proprietary index products, as well as FX options based on foreign currency pairs. ISE also offers market data tools designed for sophisticated investors seeking information on investor sentiment, volatility, and other options data. In 2013, ISE strengthened its focus on ETF and Index development with Introduction of ISE ETF Ventures.

In August 2008, ISE Stock Exchange announced a partnership with the electronic communication network Direct Edge. The deal made the ISE Stock Exchange a wholly owned subsidiary of Direct Edge and gave ISE an ownership stake in Direct Edge.

ISE Options Exchange
The International Securities Exchange (ISE) operates three U.S. options exchanges: ISE, ISE Gemini, and ISE Mercury.

Timeline

See also
 List of stock exchanges
 List of stock exchanges in the Americas

References

External links
 

Financial services companies established in 2000
Organizations established in 2000
Stock exchanges in the United States
Options exchanges in the United States